Ron Erickson (born December 24, 1943) is an American business executive, lawyer, and angel investor based in Seattle. After co-founding Microrim in 1981, he has either founded or served as an executive for companies such as GlobalTel Resources, Inc., GlobalVision, Inc, Egghead Software, Inc., and Blue Frog Media. He was the sole investor in Double Down Interactive, a social video game studio that was sold for up to $500 million in 2012.

As well as serving on various boards, he is currently CEO of Visualant, a public company he founded focused on photon imaging and authentication technology.

Early life, education
Ronald P. Erickson was born on December 24, 1943, in Tacoma, Washington, and raised in Ellensburg, Washington. His father, Ed Erickson, worked in education as both an administrator and professor, first as superintendent of the Ellensburg School District (1952–1958), then as director of planning and development at Central Washington University, a professor and chairman for the department of education, and founding president of the Seattle Community College system.

Ron Erickson spent much of his childhood on the pioneer farm owned by his mother, Ayleen Frederick's family, which they had homesteaded in the Kittitas Valley of Washington in 1876. He graduated from Ellensburg High School. Erickson graduated with a Bachelor of Arts in history from Central Washington University, before earning a Master of Arts in American Studies at the  University of Wyoming.

Early in his career Erickson worked in public policy at the White House and the Office of Economic Opportunity in Washington, D.C., becoming the latter's branch chief for emergency food and medical services. He also worked for the Rockefeller Commission on Critical Choices in New York City.

He studied law at the University of California at Davis, graduating with a Juris Doctor, and is licensed to practice law through the Washington State Bar Association. He has worked in Seattle at firms such as Kargianis, Austin & Erickson, and Ronald P. Erickson & Associates.

Business career
In the late 1970s Erickson began a long-term career as a business executive and investor, working primarily with companies in the high technology, telecommunications, micro-computer, and digital media industries. The companies have been both public and private, starting with Microrim in 1981. In the early 1980s he became chairman and CEO at NBI, Inc. He was an initial investor in Egghead Software, where ultimately he served variously as chairman, vice-chairman, and interim CEO.

He also co-founded and served as chairman and CEO of GlobalTel Resources, Inc., a telecommunications networking company. Erickson previously served as chairman and CEO of the transaction processing company eCharge Corporation,

Microrim

Among Erickson's first projects was Microrim, Inc., a company he co-founded with his brother Wayne Erickson in 1981 to develop R:Base, the first relational database for the PC.

Egghead

He was an original investor in Egghead Software, Inc., which was founded by Victor Alhadeff in 1984 as a computer software retail company. Erickson served variously as chairman, interim president and CEO, and director, before leaving the company in 1994.

Blue Frog
Blue Frog Media was a Seattle mobile media and entertainment company co-founded by Erickson. Originally called Blue Frog Mobile, it sold ringtones, wallpaper images, and games to cell-phone users. In 2006 Blue Frog became best known for founding NOYZ, a television network that aired mostly pop and hip hop music videos, where members could send text messages to be placed on the air. Erickson was chairman and CEO of the company until 2007.

Double Down Interactive
After Blue Frog Mobile dissolved, Blue Frog co-founder Cooper DuBois contacted Erickson to be the sole investor for PickJam, a startup which ran online trivia games. The profits from that company were turned into Double Down Interactive, a social video game studio. Double Down Interactive had its first blackjack game on Facebook in spring of 2010, and turned a profit immediately. In early 2012 Double Down Interactive was acquired by slot-machine company International Game Technology for up to $500 million. The transaction was following the U.S. Justice Department’s decision to drop its legal objections to online gambling.

Visualant
Erickson founded the photon imaging and authentication company Visualant, Inc., and was appointed CEO on September 29, 2003. Visualant is a public company, and their shares trade under . He resigned from being CEO on August 31, 2004, and was appointed chairman of the board. As of May 12, 2010, he serves as chairman and CEO.

The Seattle-based company gained over $5 million in external funding, which was used to purchase TransTech as a subsidiary, and continue the development and commercialization of the Visualant Spectral Pattern Matching™ (SPM) technology, which directs structured light onto a substance or material to capture what the company calls "ChromaID." In November 2013 he announced the company would be shipping a "lab kit" of the technology to specific parties, such as other technology companies, to allow for invention and development.

He announced an agreement with Intellectual Ventures to accelerate the development of the Visualant intellectual property and expand its business development efforts.

According to Erickson, "Everything in the world has a unique machine readable chromatic or color identifier. With our ChromaID technology we can read that unique identifier. I think ChromaID technology will, within a decade, be embedded in everyday devices and become a part of our daily lives."

Board memberships and affiliations
The following is a partial list of affiliations Erickson has had with companies and institutions.
Current
Central Washington University – Board of Trustees
biOasis Incorporated

Past
EDC  –  chairman and director
AFM Hospitality Corporation  –   board member
Airbomb  –   director
AEI Music Network, Inc. –    board member
Braden Valley Mines Inc – president, board member
Digital Data Networks Inc –  chairman and director
FreeInternet.com  –   director
Intrinsyc Software Inc  –   chairman and director
IQ Technology Inc. –  director
 ivi, Inc – chairman
Newsgrade, Inc.  –   chairman and director
Pantheon Systems  –   director
Pocketop Inc  –   board member
Swedish Hospital Summit Club  –  board member
Telecalc, Inc.  –   director
Upgrade International, Inc.  –   director
WesTower Communications Inc  –   director

Personal life
As of 2013 Erickson lives on Bainbridge Island in Washington, with his wife, Dia Armenta. He has two adult daughters. Erickson has competed in the Ironman Triathlon and Half Ironman, and starting in 2004 was thrice ranked as the number one triathlete in his age group in the Northwest.

See also
Angel investing

References

External links
RonErickson.com

1943 births
Central Washington University alumni
Living people
University of California, Davis alumni
People from Tacoma, Washington
People from Ellensburg, Washington